Danny Campbell was a New Zealand former rugby league footballer who played professionally for Wigan (Heritage № 755), Leigh (Heritage № 951) and Runcorn Highfield.

Playing career
Campbell played for the Far North Falcons and represented Northland.

Danny Campbell moved to England in 1979, joining Wigan. Danny Campbell played right-, i.e. number 10, in Wigan's 15-4 victory over Leeds in the 1982–83 John Player Trophy Final during the 1982–83 season at Elland Road, Leeds on Saturday 22 January 1983. Danny Campbell was an interchange/substitute in Wigan's 28-24 victory over Hull F.C. in the 1985 Challenge Cup Final during the 1984–85 season at Wembley Stadium, London on Saturday 4 May 1985. He played in a total of 145 matches for Wigan between 1979 and 1986.

He was part of the New Zealand squad during their 1980 tour of Great Britain and France, but did not appear in any of the Test matches.

On 25 August 2021, Leigh Centurions announced on Twitter that he had died at home in Mitimiti, New Zealand. He left a wife and four children.

References

External links
Statistics at wigan.rlfans.com

1956 births
2021 deaths
Leigh Leopards players
Liverpool City (rugby league) players
New Zealand expatriate sportspeople in England
New Zealand national rugby league team players
New Zealand rugby league players
Northland rugby league team players
Rugby league props
Rugby league second-rows
Wigan Warriors players